Fuck Me Jesus is the first demo by Swedish metal band Marduk. It was recorded and mixed at Gorysound Studios, and released in June 1991.

The musical style for this album was straightforward death metal influenced by black metal, but not as fast and intense as the band's later signature sound.

It was re-released by Osmose Productions on 21 April 1995 on CD and 7-inch vinyl limited to 700 hand-numbered copies, again on CD in 1999 with three bonus tracks, and again in 2006 on a 10-inch mLP limited to 500 copies.

Fuck Me Jesus was banned in seven countries following its CD release, due to its controversial title and explicit cover art.

"Departure from the Mortals", "The Black..." and "Within the Abyss" were re-recorded for the band's 1992 debut, Dark Endless.

Track listing

Musical style 
In his book Swedish Death Metal, Daniel Ekeroth describes Fuck Me Jesus as "a very death metal–sounding recording with a heavy and fat sound. The song structures are basically death metal as well, combining heavy riffs with hammering two-beats. What makes a difference are some occasional grind parts, melodic guitars, and of course the hellish vocals of Andreas."

Personnel 
 Andreas Axelsson – vocals
 Morgan Steinmeyer Håkansson – guitar
 Rikard Kalm – bass
 Joakim Göthberg – drums, vocals
 Dan Swanö – mixing

References 

1991 albums
Marduk (band) albums